Pierre Chen or Chen Tai-Min (born 1958) is a Taiwanese art collector and businessman. He is the founder and chairman of Yageo Corporation, which deals with electronic domains and makes electronic components for mobiles, automobiles, laptops and desktops, and key electronic devices. He was listed at number 550 in the 2021 Forbes list of billionaires in the world and at number 9 in Taiwan.

Biography
Chen grew up in Kaoshiung in a middle-class Taiwan family. He received a BS degree in engineering from National Cheng Kung University in Taiwan. He founded Yageo in 1977.

Chen is the owner of 47 sales offices, 40 manufacturing sites, 20 R&D centers worldwide and was in charge of in Yageo's day-to-day management.

Art collection
Chen is well known as an art collector, having collected since 1976. One of the paintings in his collection is Tamsui, an oil painting by Japanese-period Taiwanese artist Tan Ting-pho.  The painting was purchased for $4.5 million (NT$144 million), setting a world record for a ‘NT $100 million’ purchase of an oil painting by an ethnic Chinese artist. Chen's art collection is administered through the Yageo Foundation.

References

External links
 

1958 births
Living people
20th-century Taiwanese businesspeople
21st-century Taiwanese businesspeople
Businesspeople from Kaohsiung
National Chengchi University alumni
Taiwanese billionaires
Taiwanese art collectors
Taiwanese company founders
Taiwanese engineers
Taiwanese manufacturing businesspeople